Scott Barney (born March 27, 1979) is a Canadian former professional ice hockey forward, who played 27 games in the National Hockey League with the Los Angeles Kings and Atlanta Thrashers between 2003 and 2005. The rest of his career, which lasted from 1999 to 2018, was mainly spent in Europe and Asia. Barney currently serves as the head coach and general manager for the Humboldt Broncos of the Saskatchewan Junior Hockey League, having agreed to a 3 year contract extension on March 31, 2019.

Playing career
Barney was drafted by the Los Angeles Kings 29th overall in the 1997 NHL Entry Draft. He did not get to play in the National Hockey League until the 2002–03 season, because he missed three consecutive seasons due to a severe back injury. He also played for the Atlanta Thrashers. Barney played a total of 27 games in the NHL, scoring 5 goals and adding 6 assists for 11 points.  He was loaned to the Hershey Bears in March 2007 from the Grand Rapids Griffins and was re-signed by the Bears for the 2007–08 season on July 31, 2007. For 2008–09 he moved to Germany to play for Augsburger Panther. In 2009–10 he started the season in SC Bietigheim-Bissingen, but was signed by Finnish team SaiPa in October. He continued with the team for 2010–11 season.

On November 21, 2010, he joined BK Mladá Boleslav of the Czech Extraliga. After just 13 games with Boleslav however, Barney returned to Finland on January 18, 2011 to complete the 2010–11 season with HPK.

Barney returned to HPK for the 2011–12 season. He was briefly loaned to EC Red Bull Salzburg for the non-regulation European Trophy, but returned to play for HPK. He then left HPK  part-way through the season to help out the second-tier teams HC Thurgau and Dornbirner EC of the Swiss National League B and Austrian National League, respectively.

Barney played the 2012–13 season in the Asian Ice Hockey League with South Korean team High1. On August 8, 2013 Barney signed with HC Valpellice of the Italian Elite.A.  For the 2014-15 season, he signed with Austrian team EHC Lustenau of the Inter-National League, where he played for two seasons before ending his playing career.

Career statistics

Regular season and playoffs

International

References

2005 NHL Official Guide & Record Book

External links

1979 births
Living people
HL Anyang players
Atlanta Thrashers players
Augsburger Panther players
BK Mladá Boleslav players
Canadian expatriate ice hockey players in Austria
Canadian expatriate ice hockey players in China
Canadian expatriate ice hockey players in Finland
Canadian expatriate ice hockey players in Germany
Canadian expatriate ice hockey players in Italy
Canadian ice hockey forwards
China Dragon players
Dornbirn Bulldogs players
Chicago Wolves players
Grand Rapids Griffins players
HC Thurgau players
HC Valpellice players
Hershey Bears players
High1 players
HPK players
Ice hockey people from Ontario
Los Angeles Kings draft picks
Los Angeles Kings players
EHC Lustenau players
Manchester Monarchs (AHL) players
Peterborough Petes (ice hockey) players
SaiPa players
SC Bietigheim-Bissingen players
Sportspeople from Oshawa
Springfield Falcons players
Canadian expatriate ice hockey players in the United States
Canadian expatriate ice hockey players in the Czech Republic
Canadian expatriate ice hockey players in South Korea
Canadian expatriate ice hockey players in Switzerland